Aleksandar Lazić (born 10 June 1996) is a Bosnian professional basketball player for Budućnost VOLI in the Prva A Liga and the ABA League.

Playing career 
Lazić started his senior career in Olimpija in 2012 and then moved to Dynamic in 2016, from where he moved to the Mega Bemax.

On 28 July 2022, Lazić signed for Budućnost VOLI.

National team career 
During the summer of 2017, Lazić played for the Bosnia and Herzegovina national team in pre-qualification for the World Cup.

References

External links
 at Eurobasket
 at RealGM
 at Euroleague
 at FIBA
NBA SCOUTING 2018

1996 births
Living people
ABA League players
Basketball League of Serbia players
Bosnia and Herzegovina men's basketball players
Bosnia and Herzegovina expatriate basketball people in Serbia
Bosnia and Herzegovina expatriate basketball people in Slovenia
Bosnia and Herzegovina expatriate basketball people in Montenegro
KK Dynamic players
KK Mega Basket players
KK Mornar Bar players
KK Olimpija players
People from Milići
Serbs of Bosnia and Herzegovina
Small forwards